Pleocoma behrensii is a species of rain beetle in the family Pleocomidae. It is found on the Pacific Coast of North America.

References

Scarabaeiformia